Tracey Nicole Cross, OAM (born 4 December 1972) is an Australian visually impaired swimmer.  She won ten medals at three Paralympics, from 1992 to 2000.

Personal
Cross was born in the Western Australian city of Bunbury on 4 December 1972. She has been blind since birth; in a 2000 interview, she said that the light perception that she had in one eye was "almost useless". She was left out of sporting activities at school, and started swimming at the age of 15. She took the sport casually at first, but took it more seriously when she found that she had a natural aptitude for swimming.

In 1994, she obtained a law degree from Murdoch University. After working in that field for some years, she became a massage therapist; she works in a natural health clinic in West Perth. Cross developed her passion for massage after she sustained a neck and shoulder injury while training for the 2000 Sydney Paralympics.

Swimming career

 
Cross won her first international gold medal in the women's 400 m Freestyle B1 at the 1990 World Championships and Games for the Disabled in Assen, Netherlands.

At the 1992 Barcelona Games, she won two gold medals in the Women's 100 m Freestyle B1 and Women's 400 m Freestyle B1 events, and two silver medals in the Women's 100 m Backstroke B1 and Women's 200 m Medley B1 events; she also came fourth in both the Women's 100 m Butterfly B1 and Women's 50 m Freestyle B1 events.

She won two gold medals at the 1996 Atlanta Games in the Women's 100 m Butterfly B1 and the Women's 200 m Medley B1 events, and a silver medal in the Women's 50 m Freestyle B1 event; she also came fifth in the Women's 100 m Backstroke B1 event and came seventh in the heats of the Women's 400 m Freestyle B2 event.

She spoke the Paralympic oath at the opening ceremony of the 2000 Sydney Paralympics. In the competition, she received two silver medals in the Women's 100 m Freestyle S11 and the Women's 400 m Freestyle S11 events, and a bronze medal in the Women's 50 m Freestyle S11 event; she also came fifth in the Women's 200 m Medley SM11 event and eighth in the Women's 100 m Backstroke S11 event.

Recognition
In 1993, Cross received a Medal of the Order of Australia for her 1992 Paralympic gold medals. In that year, she also received the Western Australian Citizen of the Year Award in the Youth category. On 14 November 2000, she received an Australian Sports Medal "For Service to Sport as a gold Medallist at the Paralympic Games". She received a Centenary Medal on 1 January 2001 "For service to the community through Paralympic swimming". In 2009, she was inducted into the Swimming Western Australia Hall of Fame.

References

Female Paralympic swimmers of Australia
Swimmers at the 1992 Summer Paralympics
Swimmers at the 1996 Summer Paralympics
Swimmers at the 2000 Summer Paralympics
Medalists at the 1992 Summer Paralympics
Medalists at the 1996 Summer Paralympics
Medalists at the 2000 Summer Paralympics
Paralympic gold medalists for Australia
Paralympic silver medalists for Australia
Paralympic bronze medalists for Australia
Paralympic medalists in swimming
S11-classified Paralympic swimmers
Medalists at the World Para Swimming Championships
Australian female freestyle swimmers
Australian female medley swimmers
Australian female backstroke swimmers
Australian female butterfly swimmers
Recipients of the Medal of the Order of Australia
Recipients of the Australian Sports Medal
Recipients of the Centenary Medal
People from Bunbury, Western Australia
Sportswomen from Western Australia
Murdoch University alumni
Paralympic swimmers with a vision impairment
Australian blind people
1972 births
Living people